Sun Man (born 22 August 1995) is a Chinese rower. He competed in the men's lightweight double sculls event at the 2016 Summer Olympics.

References

External links

1995 births
Living people
Chinese male rowers
Olympic rowers of China
Rowers at the 2016 Summer Olympics
Place of birth missing (living people)
World Rowing Championships medalists for China
People from Jinzhou
Rowers from Liaoning
20th-century Chinese people
21st-century Chinese people